Menang is a traditional dance of the Tikar or the Semi-Bantu group of people from the Adamawa mountains of Cameroon.

References

Cameroonian culture